Athletic Bilbao is an association football club based in Bilbao, in Biscay in the Basque Country of Spain. The club was a founder member of the Spanish league, better known as La Liga, in 1928, and has won the league championship eight times. As of 2012, Athletic has played for 82 years in the Primera División, the top tier of Spanish football, and is one of only three clubs, the others being Real Madrid and Barcelona, never to have been relegated from La Liga.

The club is known for its policy of recruiting only players from the greater Basque Country, a region which includes Labourd, Soule and Lower Navarre in France as well as the Spanish provinces of Biscay, Guipúzcoa, Álava and Navarre. This policy, which for many years applied both to signings from other clubs and to youngsters admitted to the club's academy, has in recent years become more flexible, so that players whose career developed in the youth system of other clubs in the region are now acceptable, irrespective of their country of birth.

Athletic won the Copa del Rey three times between 1914 and 1916. The team of that period included the prolific goalscorer Rafael "Pichichi" Moreno; he scored the first goal in the San Mamés Stadium on 21 August 1913, scored a hat-trick in the 1915 Copa del Rey final, and his 89 games for the club produced a total of 78 goals. Since 1953, the top scorer in La Liga each season has been awarded the Pichichi Trophy, named in his honour.

On 29 September 1940 Telmo Zarra played his first league match for the club. During his time at Athletic, he won six Pichichi awards, a league record, and helped the club achieve a league championship and five Copa del Rey trophies. He retired in 1955, having played 352 matches and scored 333 goals. Joseba Etxeberria, who joined Athletic from Real Sociedad in 1995 for a record transfer fee of €3 million, is the player with the most appearances for the club in the last 30 years. He signed a one-year extension to his contract in 2009 in which he agreed to play the 2009–10 season unpaid in the hope of reaching 500 games before he retired; he finished the season (and his professional career) on 514.

Players

Appearance and goal totals include matches in La Liga, Copa del Rey, Supercopa de España, UEFA Champions League, UEFA Europa League and regional competitions. Substitute appearances are included. Table is initially sorted in descending order of appearances and includes all Athletic players who have made 200 appearances or more.

Key

Notes
NB1.  For a full description of positions see football positions.
NB2.  Regarding regional competitions; Athletic Bilbao competed in the Basque Cup and Biscay Championship until 1940.
Pichichi.  Won the Pichichi Trophy while at Athletic. Gorostiza was the first Athletic player to receive the trophy with 19 goals. Zarra holds the joint-record (with Messi) for most Pichichis in La Liga with six.
Zamora.  Won the Zamora Trophy while at Athletic. Blasco was the first Athletic player to receive the trophy. Blasco also has the record of most Zamora trophies won by a single Athletic player,  with three.
A.  Iribar had the most appearances in La Liga, with 466, and overall, with 614, for Athletic.
B.  Zarra is La Liga's 3rd highest goalscorer with 251 goals, behind Lionel Messi and Cristiano Ronaldo. He has the record for most goals scored in all competitions, with 333, for Athletic.

See also
List of Basque footballers

References

External links
Official website:
Appearances
Goalscorers
A-Z of players 
Debuts
 Athletic Club players in La Liga at BDFutbol

 
Players
Athletic Bilbao
Association football player non-biographical articles
Players